The 20th Dalmatia Division (Serbo-Croatian Latin: Dvadeseta dalmatinska divizija) was a Yugoslav Partisan division formed in Vrdovo on 10 October 1943. It was formed from the 8th, 9th and 10th Dalmatia Brigades which had a total of around 3,100 soldiers at the time. It was a part of the 8th Corps during all of its existence. Commander of the division was Velimir Knežević and its political commissar was Živko Živković. The division mostly fought in Dalmatia, Bosnia and Herzegovina.

References 

Divisions of the Yugoslav Partisans
Military units and formations established in 1943